The following is a list of paintings by Italian Renaissance painter Raphael. Together with Michelangelo and Leonardo da Vinci he forms the traditional trinity of great masters of that period. He was enormously prolific, despite his early death at 37, and a large body of work remains, especially in the Vatican, where Raphael and a large team of assistants, executing his drawings under his direction, frescoed the Raphael Rooms known as the Stanze. He was extremely influential in his lifetime, but after his death the influence of his rival Michelangelo was more widespread until the 18th and 19th centuries, when his more tranquil qualities were again widely taken as models.

List of paintings

See also
Portrait of a Young Man (Raphael)
St John the Baptist in the Desert (Raphael)

Footnotes

Notes

References

Further reading
 Christof Thoenes. Raphael. TASCHEN. 2007.
 Official sites of the museums

External links
 Wikimedia's catalog of Raphael's paintings

 
Raphael
Nude art